Ophichthus aniptocheilos is an eel in the family Ophichthidae. It was described by John E. McCosker in 2010. It is a marine, deep water-dwelling eel known from Tonga, in the eastern central Pacific Ocean.

The species epithet aniptocheilos means "unwashed lips" in Greek, and is treated as a noun in apposition. It refers to the colouring of the face.

References

Fish described in 2010
Taxa named by John E. McCosker
aniptocheilos